Sura is a genus of moths in the family Sesiidae.

Species
Sura ellenbergeri (Le Cerf, 1917)
Sura lampadura  Meyrick, 1935
Sura melanochalcia (Le Cerf, 1917)
Sura pyrocera  Hampson, 1919
Sura ruficauda (Rothschild, 1911)
Sura rufitibia  Hampson, 1919
Sura xanthopyga (Hampson, 1919)
Sura xylocopiformis  Walker, 1856
Sura chalybea  Butler, 1876
Sura cyanea  Hampson, 1919
Sura ignicauda (Hampson, [1893])
Sura phoenicia  Hampson, 1919
Sura pryeri  Druce, 1882
Sura uncariae  Schneider, 1940

References

Sesiidae